Altaysky (masculine), Altayskaya (feminine), or Altayskoye (neuter) is the name of several rural localities in Russia:
Altayskoye, Altaysky District, Altai Krai, a selo in Altaysky District of Altai Krai
Altayskoye, Tabunsky District, Altai Krai, a selo in Tabunsky District of Altai Krai